Lovetap! (stylized as LOVETAP!) is the debut studio album by Los Angeles indie pop band, Smallpools, released on March 24, 2015. The album was made available for streaming on March 17, 2015 via Spotify.

Track listing 

 Tracks 3, 6, 7, and 13 were previously released on the Smallpools EP

References

2015 debut albums
Smallpools albums